The Action were an English band of the 1960s, formed as the Boys in August 1963, in Kentish Town, North West London. They were part of the mod subculture, and played soul music-influenced pop music.

Career
The band was formed as the Boys in August 1963, in Kentish Town, North West London. The original members were Reg King (lead vocals), Alan 'Bam' King (rhythm guitar, vocals), Mike "Ace" Evans (bass guitar, vocals) and Roger Powell (drums). They had a brief spell as a bar band in Germany, and then as a backing band for Sandra Barry, (sometimes referred to as Sandra Barry and the Boyfriends) playing on her single "Really Gonna Shake" in 1964. After the stint with Barry, Pete Watson was recruited as lead guitarist, and in 1964 they changed their name to The Action.

Shortly after their name change, they signed to Parlophone with producer George Martin. "Land of a Thousand Dances" b/w "In My Lonely Room" was well received by critics, but sold poorly. None of The Action's singles achieved success in the UK Singles Chart.

Dissatisfied with the stewardship of their manager Rikki Farr, Pete Watson left the band in late 1966. The Action continued as a quartet but were dropped by Parlophone in mid-1967, by which time they had also parted ways with Rikki Farr. They then assumed control of their own affairs, and soon afterwards keyboardist Ian Whiteman joined the band in an effort to expand their sound in order to help secure a new recording contract; by November, however, Whiteman had departed, driven out by Reg King's increasingly unpredictable behaviour; guitarist Martin Stone was soon recruited in his place.

The Action now set about gathering original new material for a projected LP, but recording demos in a radically different Byrds-influenced psychedelic style failed to secure them their hoped-for recording deal (the 1967/68 demos were eventually released in the 1990s under the title Rolled Gold). With the band seemingly having reached an impasse vocalist Reg King's behaviour became increasing unpredictable, and he departed the band in mid-1968. Following Reg King's exit, Ian Whiteman returned, sharing vocal duties with Alan King; at this point The Action decided on a brief change of name to Azoth. However the band soon reverted to their old name to record a new set of five demos, where they moved toward a more mid-tempo West Coast-influenced psychedelic ballad style and then into folk rock (these demos were eventually released in 1985 as The Action Speaks Louder Than Words). By January 1969, however, upon signing to Head Records (a fledgling independent label run by their former roadie John Curd), The Action was finally and permanently re-christened (by Curd) Mighty Baby, under which name they released two albums in 1969 (Mighty Baby) and 1971 (A Jug Of Love), before breaking up at the end of 1971.

Alan King later went on to form Ace, who had a US hit in 1975 with "How Long".

A 1980 compilation of the Action's Parlophone tracks came with sleeve notes by Paul Weller ("The Action had it in their soul") and did much for their profile, while the Rolled Gold album demos were hailed as lost classics when they were reissued in the 1990s. In 1998, the original lineup of the Action reformed for a concert on the Isle of Wight. The band then played regularly over the next six years.

They are one of the favourite bands of Phil Collins, who performed with the reunited band in June 2000. "For me it was like playing with the Beatles", he later commented on the experience.

Discography

Singles
as Sandra Barry and The Boys
"Really Gonna Shake" / "When We Get Married" (R. King) (March 1964, Decca)
as The Boys
"It Ain't Fair"  (R. King/Evans) / "I Want You" (R. King/Evans) (November 1964, Pye)
as The Action
"Land of a Thousand Dances" b/w "In My Lonely Room" (Holland-Dozier-Holland) (October 1965, Parlophone)
"I'll Keep Holding On" / "Hey Sah-Lo-Ney" (February 1966, Parlophone)
"Baby, You've Got It" (McAllister, Vail) / "Since I Lost My Baby" (Robinson/Moore) (July 1966, Parlophone)
"Never Ever" (King/King/Evans/Powell) / "Twenty Fourth Hour" (King/King/Evans/Powell) (February 1967, Parlophone)
"Shadows and Reflections" (Larry Marks/Tandyn Almer) / "Something Has Hit Me" (King/Jones) (June 1967, Parlophone)
"Harlem Shuffle" / "Wasn't It You" (Goffin/King) (1968, Hansa, Germany only)
French EP: "Shadows and Reflections" / "Something Has Hit Me" / "Never Ever" / "Twenty Fourth Hour" (Odeon (MOE 149), 1967)

Compilation albums
The Ultimate! Action(singles and other material recorded by the original run of the band, 1964–1967)
 "I'll Keep Holding On"
 "Harlem Shuffle"
 "Never Ever"
 "Twenty Fourth Hour"
 "Since I Lost My Baby"
 "In My Lonely Room"
 "Hey Sha-Lo-Ney"
 "Wasn't It You?"
 "Come On, Come With Me"
 "Just Once in My Life"
 "Shadows and Reflections"
 "Something Has Hit Me"
 "The Place"
 "The Cissy"
 "Baby You've Got It"
 "I Love You (Yeah!)"
 "Land of a Thousand Dances"

Brain/Rolled Gold (Tracks recorded in late 1967 and 1968, but released only in 1995):
 "Come Around"
 "Something to Say"
 "Love is All"
 "Icarus"
 "Strange Roads"
 "Things You Cannot See"
 "Brain"
 "Look at the View"
 "Climbing Up the Wall"
 "Really Doesn't Matter"
 "I'm a Stranger"
 "Little Boy"
 "Follow Me"
 "In My Dream"
 "In My Dream" (Demo)

Action Speaks Louder Than (EP) (tracks recorded circa. 1968, released by Castle Music in 1985):
 "Only Dreaming"
 "Dustbin Full of Rubbish"
 "An Understanding Love"
 "My Favourite Day"
 "A Saying for Today" (all tracks written by Whiteman)

Uptight and Outasight (radio and TV recordings, CD bonus: 1998 live recording) (Circle Records):
CD1 – The Action on Television and BBC Radio 1966–1967
 "I'll Keep Holding On"
 "Land of 1000 Dances"/"Uptight"
 "Mine Exclusively" (BBC Radio's Saturday Club 1966)
 Reg King Interview (BBC Radio's Saturday Club 1966)
 "Baby You've Got It "(BBC Radio's Saturday Club 1966)
 "Take Me in Your Arms (Rock Me A While)" (BBC Radio's Saturday Club 1966)
 "Going to a Go Go" (BBC Radio's Pop North 1966)
 "Never Ever" (BBC Radio's Pop North 1966)
 "Love Is All" (BBC Radio's Saturday Club 1967)
 "I See You" (BBC Radio's Saturday Club 1967)
 "India" (BBC Radio's Saturday Club 1967)
 "Shadows and Reflections" (BBC Radio's Saturday Club 1967)

CD2 – The Boston Arms, London 1998
 "Meeting Over Yonder"
 "The Monkey Time" (Curtis Mayfield)
 "Baby Don't You Do It"
 'In My Lonely Room"
 "I Love You (Yeah!)"
 "Girl (Why You Wanna Make Me Blue)"
 "Ooo Baby Baby"
 "Crazy About You Baby"
 "Heatwave"
 "People Get Ready"
 "The Memphis Train"
 "Since I Lost My Baby"
 "Harlem Shuffle"
 "Baby You've Got It"
 "I'll Keep Holding On"
 "Land of 1000 Dances"

In addition to this in 1980, Edsel released a compilation of all The Action's original UK singles called The Ultimate Action (Edsel ED101) and after that four singles using the same material:
"I'll Keep on Holding On/Wasn't It You?" – E5001 1981
"Since I Lost My Baby/Never Ever/Wasn't It You?" – E5002 1981
"Shadows and Reflections/Something Has Hit Me" – E5003 1982
"Hey Sha-Lo-Ney/Come On, Come With Me" – E5008 1984

References

Further reading
Ian Hebditch, Jane Shepherd: The Action – In the Lap of the Mods (2012, with Mike Evans and Roger Powell, foreword by George Martin);

External links
Official site for The Action and Mighty Baby
Biography

Musical groups from the London Borough of Camden
Parlophone artists
British soul musical groups
English soul musicians
Musical groups established in 1963
Musical groups disestablished in 1969
British rhythm and blues boom musicians
Hansa Records artists
Capitol Records artists
1963 establishments in England